Alhambra station was a train station in Alhambra, California. It was last served by the Amtrak Sunset Limited.

History
Opened in 1886 as Shorb, the station was a stop on the transcontinental Southern Pacific Railroad Sunset Limited. The first building was located at Garfield Avenue and Mission Road.

Pacific Electric built their route for the Shorb Line spur here in 1912 to connect their interurban system to the transcontinental passenger network; their passenger service ceased in 1924.

The station building was reconstructed in 1940. Passenger services were commuted to Amtrak in 1971, who took over operations at the depot. Trains ceased to stop in 1975 as the station was bypassed. The tracks were depressed into a trench by the city with work starting in 1977. The tracks currently run in the trench below surface grade throughout Alhambra, rejoining grade-level tracks in El Monte adjacent to Metrolink’s El Monte station, served by the San Bernardino Line. The station was subsequently destroyed by a fire in 1984.

References

Alhambra, California
Railway stations in the United States opened in 1886
Railway stations closed in 1975
Former Amtrak stations in California
Former Southern Pacific Railroad stations in California
Amtrak stations in Los Angeles County, California
Demolished railway stations in the United States
Pacific Electric stations